Eceköy can refer to:

 Eceköy, Bozüyük
 Eceköy, Tefenni